The Grand Illinois Trail (occasionally abbreviated GIT) is a multipurpose recreational trail in the northern part of the U.S. state of Illinois. Parts of it are in the coast-to-coast American Discovery Trail.

Confirmed as a highest priority for the Illinois Department of Natural Resources over the course of several statewide Conservation Congresses, the Grand Illinois Trail is within easy reach to over eight million people. Those who complete a trail journal and confirm completion with the IDNR are granted the title of Trailblazer.

The Grand Illinois Trail began life in 1992 when La Salle County residents Todd Volker, Bill Brown and Blouke Carus began exploring ways to connect the existing Hennepin and Illinois & Michigan Canal state trails. By completing a short 16-mile gap, a major span across the state---from Lake Michigan to the Mississippi River---could be completed. This led to IDNR involvement and its decision to extend the trail across a much broader region of Illinois.

As a trail network, the Grand Illinois Trail offers much for riders. Since it routes through the prairie state, it contains flat and easy-to-ride portions through green farmlands and pastoral vistas. But surprisingly, the GIT gives touring cyclists special glimpses into much of the essence of Illinois: the hilly and picturesque geography of Jo Daviess County, Chicago streetscapes and Lake Michigan, the Mighty Mississippi Itself, the Upper Illinois River Valley, Small Town America and medium-sized cities and suburbs.

Trail surfaces vary from asphalt trails to low-volume streets to limestone screened trails. Each trail section has its own special history and history of development: particularly noteworthy is the famous Prairie Path through the western suburbs of Chicago, which was the first long rail-trail development in America, along with the great Chicago Lakefront trail. The best long-section of the GIT is the southern section along the state canal trails, between Joliet and the Quad Cities. This southern section includes the Old Plank Road Trail, the Illinois and Michigan Canal Trail, the projected Kaskaskia Alliance Trail and the Hennepin Canal, and is the northern routing of the cross-country American Discovery Trail.

Credit for the full development of the Grand Illinois Trail goes to planners Richard Westfall and George Bellovics, trail advocacy organizations such as the League of Illinois Bicyclists and the Openlands Project, and by numerous citizens working to improve their communities.

See also

Comparable trails
 Appalachian Trail
 Mississippi River Trail
 American Discovery Trail

Subsections of the Grand Illinois Trail

 Chicago Lakefront Path
 Burnham Greenway
 Thorn Creek Trail
 Old Plank Road Trail
 Illinois and Michigan Canal Trail — also see Illinois and Michigan Canal
 Hennepin Canal Trail — also see Hennepin Canal
 Great River Trail
 Thomson Sand Prairie Trail
 Jane Addams Trail
 Pecatonica Prairie Path
 Rock River Recreation Path
 Bauer Parkway Trail
 Willow Creek Trail
 Long Prairie Trail
 Prairie Trail
 Fox River Trail (Illinois)
 Illinois Prairie Path
 North Shore Channel Trail

References

 Volker, Todd. "The Complete Grand Illinois Trail Guidebook". FirstServePress, Peoria, IL, 2003.
 Volker, Todd. (2003). "Weekend Explorer: Grand Illinois Trail, Northern Illinois".

External links
 GIT Users Guide
 The Bicyclists Guide to the Grand Illinois Trail Ride
 GIT brochure

Bike paths in the Chicago metropolitan area
Bike paths in Illinois
Hiking trails in Illinois
1992 establishments in Illinois